Byep, or (North) Makaa, is a Bantu language of Cameroon. Although spoken by the Makaa people and closely related, it is not intelligible with South Makaa.

References

Languages of Cameroon
Makaa-Njem languages